Ngurdoto Crater is a volcanic crater in Meru District, Arusha Region, Tanzania. Ngurdoto Crater is surrounded by forest whilst the crater floor is a swamp. It is located in Arusha National Park.

Environment

Climate Change Impact 
Between 1981 and 2016 there are marked areas of drying in parts of northeast and much of southern Tanzania. A clear warming trend is apparent in annual temperature. By the 2090s projected warming is in the range of 1.6 to 5.0 °C, also evenly distributed across the country. For rainfall there is strong agreement for decreases in the mean number of rain days and increases in the amount of rainfall on each rainy day (the ‘rainfall intensity’). Taken together these changes suggest more variable rainfall, with both higher likelihood of dry spells (such as droughts) and a higher likelihood of intense rainfall events (often associated with flooding). Climate change impacts of severe droughts, floods, livestock deaths, crop failures and outbreak of disease (such as cholera and malaria) are likely to be regularly observed.

References

Geography of Arusha Region
Mount Meru (Tanzania)
Volcanic craters